Tupu Ulufale (born 10 May 1987) is a Samoan rugby league footballer who represented Samoa in the 2008 World Cup.

Playing career
He is from the Marist Saints club in Samoa and was the club's MVP in 2008. In 2010 he was one of five domestic players who traveled to New Zealand to be part of the squad that faced the New Zealand national rugby league team in the first ever test match between the two sides. He is a farmer by trade.

References

Living people
Samoa national rugby league team players
1987 births
Samoan farmers
Rugby league wingers